Heparan sulfate 6-O-sulfotransferase 2 is a protein that in humans is encoded by the HS6ST2 gene.

Function

Heparan sulfate proteoglycans are ubiquitous components of the cell surface, extracellular matrix, and basement membranes, and interact with various ligands to influence cell growth, differentiation, adhesion, and migration. 

This gene encodes a member of the heparan sulfate (HS) sulfotransferase gene family, which catalyze the transfer of sulfate to HS. Different family members and isoforms are thought to synthesize heparan sulfates with tissue-specific structures and functions. Multiple transcript variants encoding different isoforms have been found for this gene.

References

Further reading